The 1964 Columbia Lions football team was an American football team that represented Columbia University during the 1964 NCAA University Division football season. Columbia finished second-to-last in the Ivy League. 

In their eighth season under head coach Aldo "Buff" Donelli, the Lions compiled a 2–6–1 record and were outscored 194 to 145. Edward C. Malmstrom was the team captain.  

The Lions' 1–5–1 conference record placed seventh in the Ivy League standings. Columbia was outscored 142 to 89 by Ivy opponents. 

Columbia played its home games at Baker Field in Upper Manhattan, in New York City.

Schedule

References

Columbia
Columbia Lions football seasons
Columbia Lions football